Dovenir Domingues Neto, commonly known as Neto (born 5 September 1981), is a Brazilian futsal player who plays for Kairat Almaty and the Brazilian national futsal team.

Personal life
Neto was born in Uberlandia, Brazil on September 5, 1981.

Awards
World Cup Gold Ball (2012)
Best Fixed Futsal League 2011
 FIFA Futsal World Cup: 2012
 Copa America de Futsal:2011
 Best Player Copa America de Futsal:2011

References

External links
FIFA profile
Futsalplanet profile
Krona Futsal profile

1981 births
Living people
Brazilian men's futsal players
Futsal defenders
People from Uberlândia
Sportspeople from Minas Gerais
Pan American Games gold medalists for Brazil
Futsal players at the 2007 Pan American Games
Medalists at the 2007 Pan American Games
Pan American Games medalists in futsal